The 2018–19 National T20 Cup was a Twenty20 domestic cricket competition that was played in Pakistan. It was the fifteenth season of the National T20 Cup in Pakistan, and was held from 10 to 25 December 2018 in Multan. Eight teams took part, with the top four teams progressing to the semi-finals. Lahore Blues were the defending champions.

Following the conclusion of the group stage, Rawalpindi, Karachi Whites, Lahore Whites and Islamabad had all progressed to the semi-finals of the tournament. In the first semi-final, Rawalpindi beat Karachi Whites by six runs to progress to the final. They were joined in the final by Lahore Whites, who beat Islamabad by 88 runs in the second semi-final. In the final, Lahore Whites beat Rawalpindi by two wickets.

Squads
Ahead of the tournament, the following players were selected. Each team picked 18 players, including two emerging players.

Points table

 Team qualified for the Semi-finals

Fixtures
The Pakistan Cricket Board (PCB) confirmed the fixtures for the tournament in December 2018.

Round-robin

Semi-finals

Final

References

External links
 Series home at ESPN Cricinfo

2018 in Pakistani cricket
2018 in Punjab, Pakistan
21st century in Multan
Cricket in Multan
December 2018 sports events in Pakistan
Domestic cricket competitions in 2018–19
2018–19 National T20 Cup 
Pakistani cricket seasons from 2000–01